Onyx Moonshine is an American twice-distilled alcoholic beverage. Although legally produced, it is marketed as "moonshine". It is made in a microdistillery in East Hartford, Connecticut. It was the official spirit of the 2012 Grammy Awards.

Production
Onyx Spirits, the company that produces Onyx Moonshine, was founded by Adam von Gootkin and Peter Kowalczyk in 2011.
 
The product is distilled in reflux column stills from a mash of mixed corn and grain. After two distillations it is approximately 80% ABV, and is then diluted to bottling strength. The bottles are corked and labeled by hand.

The product is distributed in Connecticut, Massachusetts and Rhode Island.

References

External links
 

Whiskies of the United States
Companies based in Hartford County, Connecticut
Microdistilleries
Food and drink companies based in Connecticut
Distilleries in the United States
American companies established in 2011
Food and drink companies established in 2011